The 2021 Alabama A&M Bulldogs football team represented Alabama A&M University as a member of the East Division of the Southwestern Athletic Conference (SWAC) during the 2021 NCAA Division I FCS football season. Led by fourth-year head coach Connell Maynor, the Bulldogs compiled an overall record of 7–3 with a mark of 5–3 in conference play placing third in the SWAC's East Division. The team played its home games at Louis Crews Stadium in Huntsville, Alabama.

Schedule

Game summaries

South Carolina State

at Bethune–Cookman

vs. Tuskegee

at Grambling State

Jackson State

Florida A&M

vs. Alabama State

Mississippi Valley State

at Texas Southern

Arkansas–Pine Bluff

References

Alabama AandM
Alabama A&M Bulldogs football seasons
Alabama AandM Bulldogs football